Little Red Flowers is a 2006 Chinese film directed by Zhang Yuan. The film was a co-production between China's Beijing Century Good-Tidings Cultural Development Company LTD and Italy's Downtown Pictures. The Dutch company, Fortissimo Films handled worldwide sales.

The film, based on author Wang Shuo's semi-autobiographical novel, Could Be Beautiful, follows a young four-year-old boy, Fang Qiang Qiang, at a kindergarten boarding school. Deposited into a world that demands conformity (rewarded by the titular little red flowers), Qiang suffers for his bullying.

The film is Zhang's second adaptation of a novel by Wang, after 2003's I Love You.

Cast
Dong Bo Wen - Fang Qiang Qiang, the four-year-old protagonist of the film
Zhao Rui - Miss Li, head teacher and disciplinarian
Li Xiao Feng - Miss Tang, a younger, more kindly teacher
Chen Li - Principal Kong

Reception
Little Red Flowers has premiered at several international film festivals. It premiered at the 2006 Berlin International Film Festival on February 15, 2006, as part of the Panorama series. In Berlin, it won the C.I.C.A.E. Award. The film also premiered at other major festivals including Sundance (as part of the World Cinema competition), and Cannes where it was in-competition.

Notes

External links

Fortissimo Films official site for Little Red Flowers

2006 comedy-drama films
2006 films
Chinese comedy-drama films
Films based on Chinese novels
Films directed by Zhang Yuan
Films set in the 1950s
2000s Mandarin-language films